Wages for Wives is a 1925 American silent comedy film directed by Frank Borzage and starring Jacqueline Logan, Creighton Hale, Earle Foxe, ZaSu Pitts, Claude Gillingwater, and David Butler. The film was released by Fox Film Corporation on December 15, 1925.

Plot
As described in a review in a film magazine, a new bride persuades her mother and a woman friend to join with her in leaving their husbands until they agree to a fifty-fifty split on their wages. The husbands rebel and decide to keep house for themselves, while the wives go to a big boarding house. Eventually, after the women have almost eaten their hearts out with longing, and a vamp has succeeded in complicating matters, reconciliations occur after the recalcitrant husbands have thoroughly sickened of their attempts to show their independence.

Cast

Preservation
With no prints of Wages for Wives located in any film archives, it is a lost film.

References

External links

1926 comedy films
1926 films
Silent American comedy films
1925 films
American silent feature films
American black-and-white films
Fox Film films
Lost American films
1925 comedy films
Films directed by Frank Borzage
1920s American films
1920s English-language films